The 2015 Pac-12 Conference football season was the fifth season for the conference as a twelve-team league. The season began on September 3, 2015 with a trio of games, Arizona hosting UTSA, Utah hosting Michigan, and Hawaii hosting Colorado. The final game was the Pac-12 Championship Game at Levi's Stadium on December 5, 2015, with ESPN televising the game.

Previous season
Oregon, the North Division Champions, defeated Arizona, the South Division Champions, 51–13 to claim their second conference title and the chance to play in the College Football Playoff (CFP) semifinal game at the Rose Bowl, where they defeated Florida State 59–20, advancing to their second-ever national championship game (the first-ever CFP National Championship Game), where they were defeated by the Ohio Buckeyes, 42–20.

A record nine conference teams played in a post-season bowl game, with six winning. Arizona, the South Division Champion, was also a bowl game loser, losing to Boise State 38–30 in the Fiesta Bowl. Bowl game winners were: Arizona State defeated Duke 36–31 in the Sun Bowl, Stanford defeated Maryland 45–21 in the Foster Farms Bowl, UCLA defeated Kansas State 40–35 in the Alamo Bowl, USC defeated Nebraska 45–42 in the Holiday Bowl, and Utah defeated Colorado State 45–10 in the Las Vegas Bowl.

Pre-season
2015 Pac-12 Spring Football and number of signees on signing day:

North Division 	
 California: March 9 – April 18 with 24 signees
 Oregon: March 31 – May 2 with 22 signees
 Oregon State: March 3 – April 18 with 22 signees
 Stanford: February 23 – April 11 with 22 signees
 Washington: March 30 – April 25 with 24 signees
 Washington State: March 12 – April 28 with 24 signees

South Division 
 Arizona: March 4  – April 10 with 25 signees
 Arizona State: March 16 – April 10 with 22 signees
 Colorado: February 13 – March 15 with 19 signees
 UCLA: March 31 – April 25, 2015 with 18 signees
 USC: March 3 – April 11 with 24 signees
 Utah: March 24 – April 25 with 20 signees

Pac-12 Media
2015 Pac-12 Media Day was held at Warner Bros. in Burbank, California on July 30–31, 2015.

Preseason polls

North Division
1. Oregon (37), 262 pts
2. Stanford (8), 232 pts
3. California, 174 pts
4. Washington, 129 pts
5. Washington State, 89 pts
6. Oregon State, 60 pts
	

South Division
1. USC (32), 254 pts
2. Arizona State (7), 200 pts
3. UCLA (6), 180 pts
4. Arizona, 155 pts
5. Utah, 105 pts
6. Colorado, 46 pts

 Predicted Pac-12 Championship Game Winner: USC (21) was picked to win the Pac-12 Championship over Oregon (17) for the first time since 2012.  Others receiving votes were ASU (3), UCLA (2), and Stanford (1).

Recruiting classes

Head coaches

Coaching changes
There were one coaching change following the 2015 season including Gary Andersen with Oregon State.

Coaches

Note: Stats shown are before the beginning of the season

Rankings

Schedule

All times Mountain time.  Pac-12 teams in bold.

Rankings reflect those of the AP poll for that week.

Week 1

Players of the Week - September 7

Week 2

Players of the Week- September 14
{| class="wikitable"
|-
! colspan="2" | Offensive
! colspan="2" | Defensive
! colspan="2" | Special teams
|-
! Player
! Team
! Player
! Team
! Player
! Team
|-
| Luke Falk
| Washington State
| Gionni Paul 
| Utah
| Bralon Addison 
| Oregon
|-
| colspan="12"  style="font-size:8pt; text-align:center;"|Reference:|}

Week 3Players of the Week - September 21 Week 4Players of the Week - September 28Week 5Players of the Week - October 5Week 6Players of the Week - October 12Week 7Players of the Week - October 19Week 8Players of the Week - October 26Week 9Players of the Week - November 2Week 10Players of the Week - November 9Week 11Players of the Week - November 16Week 12Players of the Week - November 23Week 13Players of the Week - November 28Championship game

The championship game was played on December 5, 2015. It featured the teams with the best conference records from each division, Stanford from the North and USC from the South.  This was the fifth championship game (and the fifth win for the North), with Stanford appearing for the third time (and winning for the third time) and USC appearing for the first time.

Week 14 (Pac-12 Championship Game)

Bowl games
Pac-12 team is bolded.

Pac-12 vs Power Conference matchups

This is a list of the power conference teams (ACC, Big Ten, Big 12 and SEC) the Pac-12 plays in the non-conference (Rankings from the AP Poll):

Records against other conferences
2015 records against non-conference foes:Regular SeasonPost SeasonAwards and honorsAP College Football Player of the Year Christian McCaffrey, StanfordLou Groza Award Ka'imi Fairbairn, UCLA

All-Americans
The following Pac-12 players were named to the 2015 College Football All-America Team by the Walter Camp Football Foundation (WCFF), Associated Press (AP), Football Writers Association of America (FWAA), Sporting News (SN), and American Football Coaches Association (AFCA):
First team
Joshua Garnett, OL, Stanford (WCFF, AP, FWAA, SN, AFCA)
Christian McCaffrey, RB, Stanford (SN, AFCA)
Ka'imi Fairbairn, K, UCLA (WCFF, AP, FWAA, AFCA)
Tom Hackett, P, Utah (WCFF, AP, FWAA, SN, AFCA)
Christian McCaffrey, All-purpose, Stanford (AP)
Christian McCaffrey, KR, Stanford (FWAA)

Second team
Tyler Johnstone, OL, Oregon (FWAA)
Christian McCaffrey, RB, Stanford (WCFF)
Royce Freeman, RB, Oregon (FWAA)
JuJu Smith-Schuster, WR, USC (AP, FWAA, SN)
DeForest Buckner, DE, Oregon (AP, FWAA)
Ka'imi Fairbairn, K, UCLA (SN)
Christian McCaffrey, KR, Stanford (WCFF)
Dante Pettis, PR, Washington (SN)

Third team
Royce Freeman, RB, Oregon (AP)
Austin Hooper TE, Stanford (AP)
Kenny Clark, DT, UCLA (AP)
Su'a Cravens, LB, USC (AP)
Blake Martinez, LB, Stanford (AP)
Aidan Schneider, K, Oregon (AP)Academic All-America Team Member of the Year (CoSIDA)

Conference awards
The following individuals won the conference's annual player and coach awards:
Offensive Player of the Year: Christian McCaffrey, Stanford
Pat Tillman Defensive Player of the Year: DeForest Buckner, Oregon
Offensive Freshman of the Year: Josh Rosen, UCLA
Defensive Freshman of the Year: Cameron Smith, USC
Coach of the Year: Mike Leach, Washington State; David Shaw, Stanford

All-Conference teams
The following players earned All-Pac-12 honors.Offense:Defense:Specialists:All-AcademicFirst teamHome game attendance

 Game played at Levi's Stadium in Santa Clara, CA. 
 Game played at CenturyLink Field in Seattle, WA.Bold''' – Exceed capacity
†Season High

Notes
 October 12, 2015 – USC terminated Steve Sarkisian as its head football coach
 October 30, 2015 – USC Athletic Director Pat Haden resigned from the College Football Playoff Selection Committee
 November 30, 2015 – Clay Helton was named USC's permanent head coach.

References